KWAW, (100.3 FM) operated as Magic 100.3 is a radio station broadcasting a Rhythmic contemporary music format. Licensed to Garapan-Saipan, Northern Mariana Islands, the station is currently owned by Leon Padilla Ganacias. The station's studios are located on the first floor of the Naru Building in Susupe.

The station was assigned the KWAW call letters by the Federal Communications Commission on January 15, 1999.

References

External links
 
 

WAW
Rhythmic contemporary radio stations in the United States
Radio stations established in 1999
1999 establishments in the Northern Mariana Islands